In a right triangle, a cathetus (originally from the Greek word ; plural: catheti), commonly known as a leg, is either of the sides that are adjacent to the right angle. It is occasionally called a "side about the right angle". The side opposite the right angle is the hypotenuse. In the context of the hypotenuse, the catheti are sometimes referred to simply as "the other two sides".

If the catheti of a right triangle have equal lengths, the triangle is isosceles. If they have different lengths, a distinction can be made between the minor (shorter) and major (longer) cathetus.

In a right triangle, the length of a cathetus is the geometric mean of the length of the adjacent segment cut by the altitude to the hypotenuse and the length of the whole hypotenuse.

By the Pythagorean theorem, the sum of the squares of the lengths of the catheti is equal to the square of the length of the hypotenuse.

The term leg, in addition to referring to a cathetus of a right triangle, is also used to refer to either of the equal sides of an isosceles triangle or to either of the non-parallel sides of a trapezoid.

In architecture, the term cathetus has been used for the eye of the volute. It was so termed because its position is determined, in an Ionic (or voluted) capital, by a line let down from the point in which the volute generates.

References

External links

 Bernhardsen, T. Geographic Information Systems: An Introduction, 3rd ed.  New York: Wiley, p. 271, 2002.
 Cathetus at Encyclopaedia of Mathematics
 

Parts of a triangle